The Grigorovich M-19 was a reconnaissance flying boat designed by Grigorovich in the late 1910s. The M-19 was a Grigorovich M-9 modified to be of the same size as the Grigorovich M-15. Assembly of the prototype was started in 1918, but the aircraft was not completed.

Specifications (M-19)

References

Bibliography

Single-engined pusher aircraft
Flying boats
1910s Russian military reconnaissance aircraft
Biplanes
M-19